Serbia and Montenegro participated in three Mediterranean Games between 1997 and 2005. At the 1997 and 2001 Mediterranean Games, it participated under the name FR Yugoslavia. Before 1997, Serbian and Montenegrin athletes competed as part of the SFR Yugoslavia team. At the 2009 Games, Serbia and Montenegro competed as independent nations for the first time.

Results by games

Medals by sport

See also
 Serbia and Montenegro at the Olympics